is a yuri shōjo manga series by Kodama Naoko. The story revolves around two high school girls/childhood friends, named Yuma and Hotaru, who each have a boyfriend but they secretly cheat with each other. Yuma cannot explain the feeling she gets around Hotaru, which eventually leads her to believe that their relationship may be more than just a friendship. The series was serialized in the monthly manga magazine Comic Yuri Hime from November 2014 to December 2017; the chapters were collected in six volumes. An anime television series adaptation by Creators in Pack aired from July to September 2017 and was simulcast with subtitles by Crunchyroll. Outside of Japan, the series is published in North America by Seven Seas Entertainment. The English version of the manga has received mixed reviews from critics.

Plot
Yuma and Hotaru have been best friends since childhood. Yuma would protect Hotaru from things such as bullies, and made it her job to look after her. Now, the two are second-year high school students, but Hotaru is anything but innocent. Yuma gets her first boyfriend and is nervous about it, so a more experienced Hotaru suggests a "dress rehearsal" to help her out. The helping out later on leads to a deep kiss with Hotaru, who says that Yuma now knows how to kiss a guy. This leaves her thinking about how much better this kiss was than the one she had shared with her boyfriend. As time goes on, Yuma worries that her boyfriend will find out what is going on between her and Hotaru. She also cannot explain these "strange" feelings she has when she is with her.

Characters

Yuma is in her second year of high school along with her best friend Hotaru. When she finds her first boyfriend (Takeda) she is not sure how to react so she asks Hotaru for advice. Yuma is surprised though when it appears as if her friend is flirting with her. She cannot explain the good feeling she gets when she French kisses Hotaru or when she gets fondled, and worries that Takeda will catch her in the act. In the second volume he decides that the two should take some space apart, and Yuma comes to terms that she is in fact cheating with Hotaru. Her feelings still remain conflicted though as she does not want to hurt him so she remains as a friend. Yuma finally confesses to Hotaru in the fifth manga volume that she has feelings towards her but is rejected. She then turns to Takeda after feeling like she had been used the entire time by her.

Hotaru is Yuma's best friend since they were children. It is shown that early on Yuma would always protect her from things such as bullies at school, but over time she surpassed her in being bold. She eventually went out with many different boyfriends, but from Yuma's point of view she would never pay attention to any of them. She is shown to be aggressive with her feelings towards Yuma, making the first moves on more than one occasion. Yuma senses though that there might be trouble between her and Fujiwara despite Hotaru's strong attitude. She later takes a job at a shady cat maid café which alarms Yuma which makes her join as well. Hotaru eventually gets surprised by Yuma's bolder moves which makes her happy yet for some reason also in pain.

Takeda is a classmate and friend of Hotaru, and is Yuma's first boyfriend. In the story he comes across as a friendly understanding guy who is aware of his girlfriend's shyness, and does his best to remedy the situation. He is unaware of Hotaru's advances towards Yuma, but later senses that she doesn't hold enough affection for him. Takeda eventually ends their dating relationship and tells Yuma to find out what she wants for herself before they go any further. The two remain friends until he starts to worry that Yuma may be in trouble with another person at Fujiwara's suggestion. He asks Yuma (who is crying) out again at the end of the fifth manga volume not knowing that she was just rejected by Hotaru.

Fujiwara is Hotaru's boyfriend, and is friends with Takeda. Early on in the story he suspects that his girlfriend may not be committed to him but initially doesn't say anything. This changes later on though when he confirms his suspicion, and drops a hint to Yuma that he knows. It is suggested that he is physically abusive to Hotaru which causes concern for Yuma when she sees that Hotaru has a black eye. Fujiwara has stated that he plans to use the knowledge of the secret relationship between the two girls to his advantage in the form of sexual favors. The two dismiss his idea as a practical joke not knowing that he has "evidence" that implies the opposite. He later lies to Yuma saying that Hotaru is moving to get away from her, and Takeda about Yuma being in an abusive new relationship.

Media

Manga
NTR: Netsuzou Trap was serialized in the manga magazine Comic Yuri Hime from November 2014 to December 18, 2017. The chapters were collected into tankōbon volumes starting on June 18, 2015 when the first volume was released; the last was number six. Seven Seas Entertainment licensed the manga in North America, and released the first volume on September 20, 2016. Seven Seas founder Jason DeAngelis had said that readers were requesting more yuri titles for release, and compared the series to Citrus in terms of potential enjoyment.

Kodama was originally considering a story between two brides, but thought that the characters seemed too old. She then had the two main characters aged down so that they were juniors in high school and liked the "sappy soap opera" results. The NTR in the title stands for netorare, which translates to "cheating" in Japanese. While the term is similar to cuckold ("husband of an adulterous wife") the couples involved here are not in a marital affair. In the story, the two girls cheat on their boyfriends by doing things with each other.

Anime
An anime television series adaptation, directed by Hisayoshi Hirasawa and produced by Creators in Pack, aired in Japan between July 5 and September 20, 2017 and was simulcast by Crunchyroll. Words in Stereo and Yūichi Uchibori wrote the scripts, and Masaru Kawashima designed the characters. A new visual was unveiled on May 15, 2017. The opening theme is "Blue Bud Blue" by Haruka Tōjō while the ending theme is "Virginal lily" by Akira Aikase.

Reception
The English version of NTR: Netsuzou Trap has received mixed reviews from manga critics. Rebecca Silverman from Anime News Network gave the series an overall C+ grade. She felt that it is a "fairly unusual yuri story", similar to what is seen in yaoi, because of the sexually aggressive nature of the romance. Silverman stated there is a strong indication that Hotaru is using boys to get over Yuma, and that Hotaru not appearing to particularly love Yuma might be masked feelings due to past problems. Although Silverman felt that it is good that the series offers variety for those who like this kind of story, and that, unlike with Hotaru, readers get a better feel for Yuma's character, she felt that the story's "less consensual romance" is uncomfortable, and critiqued the artwork of the character's upper bodies; she did, however, praise the artwork involving the character's legs. Journalist Kat Callahan agreed with Silverman on the series not being a typical example of a yuri series. She writes in her review that the series deals with the cycle of abuse when it comes to Hotaru, and that Yuma is also a victim as a result.

Yuricon founder Erica Friedman described the story as "creeptastic", saying that it is about girls who get naked to do stuff with each other while their boyfriends are "conveniently not in the room with them". Sean Gaffney from Manga Bookshelf wrote that the first volume is not for its intended audience and recommends it instead for adult men who think that girl-on-girl action is attractive.

Note

References

External links
 
Official anime Twitter account  
NTR: Netsuzou Trap at Seven Seas Entertainment

2014 manga
2017 anime television series debuts
Anime series based on manga
Creators in Pack
Crunchyroll anime
Ichijinsha manga
Infidelity in fiction
Japanese LGBT-related animated television series
Manga adapted into television series
Romance anime and manga
Seven Seas Entertainment titles
Yuri (genre) anime and manga
2010s LGBT literature